Hassan Sanniah Prakash (13 September 1951 – 27 November 2018) was an Indian politician and a four-term MLA in the state of Karnataka, representing the Hassan constituency. He was a member of Janata Dal (Secular).  Prakash served as a member of Hassan city municipal council from 1983 to 1989, and was president of the municipal council from 1985 to 1987. He was elected for the fourth time as the member of legislative assembly in the 2013 Karnataka state assembly election.
 
He was first elected as MLA for the Hassan constituency in the 1994 election.  He unsuccessfully contested the next elections in 1999, but was elected again in the 2004, 2008 and 2013 Karnataka state assembly elections.

He was also the chairman of Sanjeevini co-operative hospital from 2001, co-founded by Dr. A. C. Munivenkate Gowda and Dr. Gururaj Hebbar, which also runs an institution H. D. Deve Gowda college of nursing and paramedical science.

References

1951 births
2018 deaths
People from Hassan
Janata Dal (Secular) politicians
Karnataka MLAs 2004–2007
Karnataka MLAs 2008–2013